Karl Heinrich Höfer (14 July 1911 – 2 January 1996) was a highly decorated Major in the Luftwaffe during World War II, and one of only 882 recipients of the Knight's Cross of the Iron Cross with Oak Leaves. The Knight's Cross of the Iron Cross and its higher grade Oak Leaves was awarded to recognise extreme battlefield bravery or successful military leadership.

Awards and decorations
 Aviator badge
 Front Flying Clasp of the Luftwaffe
 Iron Cross (1939)
 2nd Class (16 September 1939)
 1st Class (12 June 1941)
 Ehrenpokal der Luftwaffe (18 November 1941)
 German Cross in Gold on 16 July 1942 as Hauptmann in the Stab/Kampfgeschwader 55
 Knight's Cross of the Iron Cross with Oak Leaves
 Knight's Cross on 3 September 1943 as Hauptmann and Gruppenkommandeur of II./Kampfgeschwader 55
 656th Oak Leaves on 18 November 1944 as Major and Gruppenkommandeur of II./Kampfgeschwader 55

Notes

References

Citations

Bibliography

External links
Lexikon der Wehrmacht
World War 2 Awards.com

1911 births
1996 deaths
People from Bad Oeynhausen
People from the Province of Westphalia
German World War II pilots
Luftwaffe pilots
Recipients of the Gold German Cross
Recipients of the Knight's Cross of the Iron Cross with Oak Leaves
Military personnel from North Rhine-Westphalia